Qu Ridong (born 1968-12-22 in Guiyang, Guizhou) is a male Chinese sports shooter. He competed for Team China at the 2008 Summer Olympics in the Double Trap Men event. He belongs to the Henan Provincial Shooting and Archery Administrative Center.

Major performances

2006 World Cup Guangzhou - 1st skeet;
2007 Asian Championships - 2nd skeet;
2008 World Cup Beijing - 1st skeet;

References

External links
 Qu Ridong profile

1968 births
Living people
People from Guiyang
Chinese male sport shooters
Skeet shooters
Olympic shooters of China
Shooters at the 2008 Summer Olympics
Asian Games medalists in shooting
Sportspeople from Guizhou
Shooters at the 2006 Asian Games
Shooters at the 2010 Asian Games
Asian Games bronze medalists for China
Medalists at the 2006 Asian Games
Medalists at the 2010 Asian Games
Sport shooters from Guizhou
21st-century Chinese people